Giacomo Poselli (22 July 1922 — 30 August 2007) was a Greek-born Albanian football player of Italian descent, who was naturalised as an Albanian citizen during his time with Flamurtari Vlorë, becoming the first foreign-born player to play for the Albania national team.

Club career
Born in Thessaloniki, Greece into an Italian family, he moved to Albania in 1932 with his family. His father was a building contractor, he obtained important building contracts in Gjirokastër and Vlorë. Giacomo then went on to play for Flamurtari Vlorë before becoming a naturalized Albanian citizen in order to compete in the 1946 Balkan Cup, which Albania won. Totally, has made 8 appearances for Albania, but only 7 are considered official games.

International career
He made his debut for Albania in an August 1946 friendly match against Montenegro and earned a total of eight caps, scoring no goals. His final international was a June 1948 Balkan Cup match against Yugoslavia.

Personal life
His brother in law, Giuseppe Terrusi, an Italo-Albanian bank director in Vlorë was arrested in retaliation in 1945 under the order of Enver Hoxha, who as a student had previously been in love with but was rejected by Terrusi's wife, Aurelia Poselli. Terrusi, allegedly innocent, was arrested in 1945 on charges of embezzlement and died in prison of Burrel in 1952. The family Poselli / Terrusi returned to Italy as refugees in 1949.

His true identity was hidden and masked by the Communist Party, who led the public to believe that he was indeed Albanian–born and was often referred to as Buzeli and Poselli. In December 2012, his story was reinstated into the Albanian Football Association museum.

The true family history Poselli / Terrusi was narrated in the book by Aldo Renato Terrusi: "Ritorno al Paese delle Aquile". The book was translated into Albanian under the title: "Brenga ime shqiptare".

References

1922 births
2007 deaths
Footballers from Thessaloniki
Albanian people of Italian descent
Association football goalkeepers
Italian footballers
Albanian footballers
Albania international footballers
Flamurtari Vlorë players
KF Tirana players
Kategoria Superiore players
Italian expatriate footballers
Italian expatriate sportspeople in Albania
Expatriate footballers in Albania
Naturalized citizens of Albania